Clara Podda (born 19 July 1951) is an Italian paralympic athlete who has won two medals at the Summer Paralympics.

Biography
Married with two children, she competed in swimming at the 1996 Summer Paralympics. She was fourth in the individual para table tennis tournament in the 2000 Summer Paralympics and also in the 2004 Summer Paralympics, before she won her first medals in the 2008 Summer Paralympics.

See also
Italy at the 2008 Summer Paralympics
Italy at the 2012 Summer Paralympics

References

External links
 

1951 births
Italian female swimmers
Italian female table tennis players
Swimmers at the 1996 Summer Paralympics
Paralympic swimmers of Italy
Table tennis players at the 2000 Summer Paralympics
Table tennis players at the 2004 Summer Paralympics
Table tennis players at the 2008 Summer Paralympics
Table tennis players at the 2012 Summer Paralympics
Paralympic table tennis players of Italy
Medalists at the 2008 Summer Paralympics
Paralympic medalists in table tennis
Paralympic silver medalists for Italy
Paralympic bronze medalists for Italy
People with paraplegia
Sportspeople from Cagliari
Living people
Sardinian women
21st-century Italian women